Ángel Manuel Olmos (born June 17, 1974 in Madrid, Spain) is a Spanish musicologist and entrepreneur. He was music technology and history professor at the University of La Rioja, Honorary Research Fellow at the University of Liverpool and is currently Professor of Musicology at the RCSMM.

Early life and career
Olmos was born on June 17, 1974, in Madrid, Spain. He studied Mining Engineering at the Polytechnic University of Madrid and completed his bachelor degree in Musicology from the Madrid Royal Conservatory in 2000. He received a doctorate of Music History and Musicology from the Paris-Sorbonne University and PhD in Economics from the University of Alcalá.

He is currently Professor of Musicology and is accredited as University Professor by National Agency for Quality Assessment and Accreditation. He has also been a professor at the University of La Rioja, Escuela Superior de Canto de Madrid, and Honorary Research Fellow for the University of Liverpool. He is the Director and General Editor of the transcription project Discantus in the National Library of Spain. He has published about fifteen books.

Research topics
Renaissance music transmission
White mensural notation
Music economics 
Music history
Big data and music features modeling
Choral music
Project management

Publications
Papeles Barbieri. Edición completa, Discantus, Madrid 2018-2020, 19 vols.
El Arte en los Protocolos. Archivo Histórico de Protocolos de Madrid, Instituto Europeo de Finanzas, Madrid 2018, 2 vols.
“A New Identity for the “Medina” Attribution in the Cancionero Musical de Palacio”, New Perspectives on Early Music in Spain, Tess Knighton and Emilio Ros-Fábregas (eds.). Edition Reichenberger, Kassel 2015, p. 163-176 
“En torno al Cancionero Musical de Palacio y Cancionero Musical de Segovia. Análisis de su origen y utilidad”, Nassarre, vol. 28 (2012), p. 45-68 
“El testamento y muerte de Tomás Luis de Victoria. Nuevos familiares del músico y posible razón para su vuelta a España”, Revista de Musicología, vol. XXXV, nº1 (2012), p. 53-60 
“Filogenia y búsqueda de patrones en la música de los trovadores mediante la distancia Levenshtein”, Inter-American Music Review, vol. XVII (Summer 2007, n. 1-2), p. 49-64 
(con Luisa Morales) “Un nuevo y breve tratado de órgano y monacordio del siglo XVII en un libro de poemas de Antonio Hurtado de Mendoza”, en Morales, Luisa (Ed.): Cinco Siglos de Música de Tecla Española,  (Leal, 2007), p. 207-218 
“Las obras de Tomás Luis de Victoria en la tablatura para órgano de Pelplin (Polonia), Biblioteka Seminarium, 304–8, 308a (1620-1630)”, en Morales, Luisa (Ed.): Cinco Siglos de Música de Tecla Española,  (Leal, 2007), p. 87-124 
Catálogo de Música Manuscrita, Catálogo de la Real Biblioteca, Tomo XV, Patrimonio Nacional, 2006. Cataloga los fondos musicales del siglo XV-XVI y parte de la música religiosa del s. XIX. 
“Tomás Luis de Victoria et le monastère des ‘Descalzas’ à Madrid : réfutation d’un mythe”, Le Jardin de Musique, I/2, (2004) p. 121-128 
“New polyphonic fragments from 15th-century Spain: a preliminary report”, Early Music, vol. 32, issue 2, p. 244-251 
“La influencia de Orlando di Lasso en la obra coral religiosa ‘a capella’ de Francis Poulenc”, Revista de Musicología, Vol. 27, Nº 1, 2004 (Ejemplar dedicado a: Actas del Simposio Internacional "El motu proprio de San Pío X y la música (1903-2003)"), p. 273-286 
“Aportaciones a la temprana historia musical de la capilla de las Descalzas Reales (1587-1608)”, Revista de Musicología, vol. XXVI, nº 2 2003, p. 439-489 
“La ubicación del texto literario en los cancioneros de los siglos XV y XVI. El uso del ennegrecimiento como ligadura”, Revista de Musicología, vol. XXV, nº2 (2002), p. 337-346 
“L’acoustique chez Francisco Tovar et les théoriciens du début du 16ème siècle : le tapage des sphères”, De la lexicologie à la théorie et à la pratique musicale, Louis Jambou (ed.), Éditions Hispaniques, Paris 2002, p. 31-41 
“El uso de trazos y puntos como ayuda para la ubicación del texto literario en los cancioneros franceses y españoles de finales del siglo XV y comienzos del XVI”, Revista de Musicología, vol. XXIV (2001), p. 89-105

References

1974 births
Living people
Spanish musicologists
Madrid Royal Conservatory alumni
Paris-Sorbonne University alumni